David Glenn Douglas (March 20, 1963 – February 27, 2016) was an American football offensive lineman who played five seasons in the National Football League (NFL) with the Cincinnati Bengals and New England Patriots. He was drafted by the Cincinnati Bengals in the eighth round of the 1986 NFL Draft. He played college football at the University of Tennessee and attended Rhea County High School in Evensville, Tennessee. Douglas died of brain cancer on February 27, 2016, at the age of 52.

References

External links
Just Sports Stats

1963 births
2016 deaths
Players of American football from Tennessee
American football offensive linemen
Tennessee Volunteers football players
Cincinnati Bengals players
New England Patriots players
People from Spring City, Tennessee
Deaths from brain cancer in the United States